Nontsikelelo Albertina Sisulu ( Thethiwe; 21 October 1918 – 2 June 2011) was a South African anti-apartheid activist, and the wife of fellow activist Walter Sisulu (1912–2003). She was affectionately known as "Ma Sisulu" throughout her lifetime by the South African public. In 2004 she was voted 57th in the SABC3's Great South Africans. She died on 2 June 2011 in her home in Linden, Johannesburg, South Africa, aged 92.

Early life
Born Nontsikelo Thethiwe in the Tsomo district of the Transkei on 21 October 1918, she was the second of five children of Bonilizwe and Monikazi Thethiwe. Sisulu's mother survived the Spanish Flu, but was constantly ill and very weak because of this. It fell upon Nontsikelelo/ Albertina, as the eldest girl, to take on a motherly role for her younger siblings. She had to stay out of school for long periods of time, which resulted in her being two years older than the rest of her class in her last year of primary school. She adopted the name Albertina when she started her schooling at a Presbyterian mission school.

Her leadership qualities and maternal instincts underlined the respect she earned during the struggle when she was referred to as the 'Mother of the Nation'. Sisulu excelled at school in cultural and sporting activities and she showed leadership skills at an early age when she was chosen as head girl in standard five.

Her classmates did not seem a major inconvenience at the time she finished primary school, later when Sisulu entered a competition to win a four-year high school scholarship this counted against her as she was disqualified from the prize even though she had come in first place. Angered by the unfair treatment (the competition rules had set no age limit on the prize), her teachers wrote to the local Xhosa language newspaper, Imvo Zabantsundu and made a strong case for her to be awarded the prize. 

The article caught the attention of the priests at the local Roman Catholic Mission who then communicated with Father Bernard Huss at Mariazell. Father Huss arranged for a four-year high school scholarship for Sisulu at Mariazell College. The Mnyila family was very happy and celebrated Sisulu's achievement with the entire village, she recalled the celebration, saying "you would have thought it was a wedding".

In 1936, she left for Mariazell College in Matatiele in the Eastern Cape and although very nervous she was excited to find that a local girl from Xolobe was a prefect at Mariazell. The school's routine was rigid and strict, pupils were woken up at 4am to bath and clean their dormitories, they would then proceed to the chapel for morning prayers. Although her scholarship covered her board and lodging, she had to pay it back during the school holidays by ploughing the fields and working in the laundry room. Sisulu only went home during the December holidays but she found this a small price to pay for the opportunity to attend high school.

With high school ending in 1939 she had to decide what she would do after school. She decided she would not marry but rather become a working professional so that she could support her family back in Xolobe. Whilst at Mariazell, she converted to Catholicism and, having resolved never to marry, she decided she would become a nun, as she admired the dedication of the nuns who taught at the college. However, Father Huss advised her against this, as nuns did not earn a salary nor did they leave the mission post, so she would not have been able to support her family in the way she wanted to. Instead he advised her to consider nursing, as trainee nurses were paid to study. Attracted by the practical solution nursing offered she took his advice and applied to various nursing schools. She was accepted as a trainee nurse at a Johannesburg "Non-European" hospital called Johannesburg General. After spending Christmas with her family in Xolobe she left for Johannesburg in January 1940.

Education

After being orphaned as a teenager, she was obliged to help provide for her younger brothers and sisters. Abandoning her ambition to train as a teacher, she left the Transkei to train as a nurse at Johannesburg's Non-European Hospital in 1940, as nurses were paid during training. She graduated from Mariazell College in 1939, and chose a career in nursing. Sisulu started work in Johannesburg as a midwife in 1946, often walking to visit patients in townships.
"You know what it means to be a midwife? You have got to carry a big suitcase full of bottles and for your lotions that you are going to use, and bowls and receivers, and we used to carry those suitcases on our heads," she said.

Political career

Sisulu did not display an interest in politics at first, only attending political meetings with Walter in a supporting capacity, but she eventually got involved in politics when she joined the African National Congress (ANC) Women's League in 1948, and took part in the launch of the Freedom Charter the same year. Sisulu was the only woman present at the birth of the ANC Youth League. She became a member of the executive of the Federation of South African Women in 1954. 

On 9 August 1956, she joined Helen Joseph and Sophia Williams-De Bruyn in a march of 20,000 women to the Union Buildings of Pretoria in protest against the apartheid government's requirement that women carry passbooks as part of the pass laws. "We said, 'nothing doing'. We are not going to carry passes and never will do so." 
The day is celebrated in South Africa as National Women's Day. She spent three weeks in jail before being acquitted on the pass charges, with Nelson Mandela as her lawyer. Sisulu opposed Bantu education, running schools from home.

Sisulu was arrested after her husband skipped jail to go underground in 1963, becoming the first woman to be arrested under the General Laws Amendment Act of 1963 enacted in May. The act gave the police the power to hold suspects in detention for 90 days without charging them. Sisulu was placed in solitary confinement for almost two months until 6 August. 

She was subsequently in and out of jail for her political activities, but she continued to resist against apartheid, despite being banned for most of the 1960s.  She was also a co-president of the United Democratic Front (UDF) in the 1980s.

From 1984 until his murder in 1989, she worked for prominent Soweto doctor, Abu Baker Asvat, who allowed her to continue with her political activities while employed by him, and she was present when he was murdered. Sisulu regarded her relationship as being that of a "mother and a son", and the two never allowed the rivalry between the UDF, and Azapo, of which Asvat was the Health Secretary, and a founding member, to interfere with their friendship or working relationship.

In 1986 she received the honorary citizenship of Reggio nell′Emilia (Italy), the first world's town that assigned this important award to Sisulu.

In 1989 she managed to obtain a passport and led a UDF delegation overseas, meeting British prime minister Margaret Thatcher and United States president George HW Bush. In London, she addressed a major anti-apartheid rally to protest against the visit of National Party leader FW de Klerk. 

In 1994, she was elected to the first democratic Parliament, which she served until retiring four years later. At the first meeting of this parliament, she had the honour of nominating Nelson Mandela as President of the Republic of South Africa. That year she received an award from then-president Mandela.

Community work

For more than 50 years, Sisulu committed herself to The Albertina Sisulu Foundation, which works to improve the lives of small children and old people. She was honoured for her commitment to the anti-apartheid struggle and her social work when the World Peace Council, based in Basel, Switzerland, elected her president from 1993 to 1996. She recruited nurses to go to Tanzania, to replace British nurses who left after Tanzanian independence. The South African nurses had to be "smuggled" out of SA into Botswana and from there they flew to Tanzania.

The Albertina Sisulu Multipurpose Resource Centre/ASC, named after Albertina Sisulu, was also founded by Sisulu. It was founded under the auspices of the Albertina Sisulu Foundation, which is a non-profit organization that was established by the Sisulu Family. Weeks later, she and Mandela opened the Walter Sisulu Paediatric Cardiac Centre for Africa in Johannesburg, named for her late husband. She became a trustee for the centre and helped fundraise for it.

Sisulu and her family were residents of Orlando West, Soweto, South Africa, when it was established. Mrs. Sisulu has witnessed first-hand the development of the community where the Sisulu family lived, sorely lacking in social services and despite enormous obstacles, has committed herself to alleviating the hardships of the community. The Albertina Sisulu Multipurpose Resource Centre/ASC provides the following services:

 A school for children with special needs –severe/moderate intellectual challenge – resource school
 An Early Childhood Development Centre for learners from the age of three years
 A section for the out of school youth with disabilities established with an intention to provide them with skills which would render them employable and active participants in the country's economy
 A nutrition programme for the needy earners
 A multi-purpose community hall
 An outreach program

Controversy

In 1997, she was called before the Truth and Reconciliation Commission, established to help South Africans confront and forgive their brutal history. Sisulu testified before the commission about the Mandela United Football Club, a gang linked to Winnie Madikizela-Mandela, accused of terrorizing Soweto in the 1980s. She was accused of trying to protect Madikizela-Mandela during the hearings, but her testimony was stark. 

She said she believed the Mandela United Football Club burned down her house because she pulled some of her young relatives out of the gang. She also testified about hearing the shot that killed her colleague, a Soweto doctor whose murder has been linked to the group. Sisulu, a nurse at the doctor's clinic, said they had a "mother and son" relationship.

Personal life

Sisulu first met Walter Sisulu in 1941 while working at Johannesburg General Hospital; at that time he was a young political activist. They married in 1944. The Sisulus – an estate agent and a nurse – married in 1944 at a ceremony in which Nelson Mandela was the best man. Also present were Anton Lembede and Evelyn Mase. The couple had five children, Max Vuyisile, Zwelakhe, Mlungisi, Lindiwe and Nonkululeko, and adopted four others including Samuel, a political activist. An adopted daughter, Beryl, served as ambassador from the Republic of South Africa to Norway.

They were married for 59 years, until he died in his wife's arms in May 2003 at the age of 90. Sisulu said of her marriage: "I was told that I was marrying a politician and there was no courtship or anything like that." Yet at his funeral their granddaughter read a tribute to him on her behalf:
"Walter, what do I do without you? It was for you who I woke up in the morning, it was for you who I lived ... You were taken away by the evils of the past the first time, but I knew you would come back to me. Now the cold hand of death has taken you and left a void in my heart."

Her husband, Walter Sisulu was found guilty of high treason and sabotage, but was spared the death sentence. He instead spent 25 years in custody on Robben Island alongside Nelson Mandela, whom he had brought into the ANC. While her husband was on Robben Island, Sisulu raised the couple's five children alone. She spent months in jail herself and had her movements restricted.

Sisulu scraped and saved for her children to attend good schools in Swaziland outside the inferior Bantu Education System. Several of the Sisulu children have themselves become leaders in the democratic South Africa. Max Sisulu is the speaker in the National Assembly; Mlungisi Sisulu is President of the Walter Sisulu Pediatric Cardiac Foundation and Chairman of Arup Africa. Beryl Sisulu is South Africa's ambassador in Norway; Lindiwe was from 2009 to 2012 the minister of defence; Zwelakhe (who died on 4 October 2012), was a prominent businessman; and daughter-in-law Elinor Sisulu, married to Max, is a well-known author and human rights activist.

In 2000, the family publicly disclosed that their adopted son, Gerald Lockman, had died of AIDS.

Quotation 

Sisulu said the following in 1987, referring to Soweto, the urban area southwest of Johannesburg constructed for the settlement of black people.

 "Women are the people who are going to relieve us from all this oppression and depression. The rent boycott that is happening in Soweto now is alive because of the women. It is the women who are on the street committees educating the people to stand up and protect each other."

Death
Sisulu died suddenly in her home in Linden, Johannesburg at age 92 on 2 June 2011 at around 20h00 in the evening while watching television with her grandchildren. According to news reports, she suddenly fell ill, coughing blood, and paramedics who rushed to the scene were unable to revive her. At the time of her death, Sisulu was survived by five children, Max, Mlungisi, Zwelakhe, Lindiwe and Nonkululeko, her adopted niece and nephew, Gerald and Beryl, and 26 grandchildren and three great-grandchildren. Her family expressed their sorrow at her death, but said that it comforted them to know that she and her beloved husband of 59 years were no doubt together again.

President Jacob Zuma paid tribute to Sisulu in the wake of her death saying "Mama Sisulu has, over the decades, been a pillar of strength not only for the Sisulu family but also the entire liberation movement, as she reared, counselled, nursed and educated most of the leaders and founders of the democratic SA", Zuma said. He also announced that Sisulu would receive a state funeral, and that national flags would be flown half-mast from 4 June until the day of her burial.

Positions held
She became national co-president of the liberal United Democratic Front at its inception in 1983. Later she joined the ANC Women's League and was elected deputy president, and in 1994 she became a member of Parliament before retiring in 1998.

Member – Federation of South African Women, South Africa
Sector: Community (1954–2011)

Treasurer – ANC Women's League, South Africa
Sector: Government & Public Administration (1959–1990)

Honours

Road named after her
In 2013, the section of the R24 Route in Gauteng, from OR Tambo International Airport in Ekurhuleni, through Johannesburg and Roodepoort, to Krugersdorp East (every street making up this section) was named after Albertina Sisulu. The freeway section of the R24 is named the Albertina Sisulu Freeway while the non-freeway section of the R24 is named Albertina Sisulu Road. The only exception is in the one-way-street sections of Johannesburg and Roodepoort, where only one street has been renamed Albertina Sisulu Road while the other street pointing the opposite direction hasn't had its name changed.

Also, the section of the R21 e-toll Highway in Gauteng from OR Tambo International Airport in Ekurhuleni to its interchange with the N1 Highway in Pretoria is commonly called the Albertina Sisulu Freeway (labelled on road signage), indicating that the R21 from Pretoria to the airport and the R24 from there to Bedfordview are together known as the Albertina Sisulu Freeway (The only alternative highway system between Pretoria and Johannesburg after the Ben Schoeman Highway).

While the section of the R24 which is not a freeway was named Albertina Sisulu Road in 2013, the freeway section of the R24, together with the R21 freeway to Pretoria, were already named the Albertina Sisulu Freeway by the time of the 2010 FIFA World Cup.

Pedestrian and cyclist bridge named after her
On 23 October 2014 the city council of the City of Ghent (East Flanders, Belgium) decided to name its new pedestrian and cyclist bridge over the river Scheldt as "Albertina Sisulubrug" (Albertina Sisulu Bridge), in honour of Albertina Sisulu. The bridge links the new city library, called the Krook ("Krook" being the old Dutch word for a bend in the river), at the Miriam Makebaplein (Miriam Makeba Square) to the Kuiperskaai.

References

External links

 Liberation leaders honoured for their contributions to democracy (12 April 2007)
 Albertina Sisulu history

1918 births
2011 deaths
People from Intsika Yethu Local Municipality
Xhosa people
Anti-apartheid activists
South African midwives
World Peace Council